Polystachya, abbreviated Pol in horticultural trade, and commonly known as yellowspike orchid, is a flowering plant genus in the orchid family (Orchidaceae). This rather distinctive genus was described by William Jackson Hooker in 1824 and is the type genus of the subtribe Polystachyinae. It contains about 100 species widespread across many of the tropical areas of the world.

Species
Polystachya species accepted by the Plants of the World Online as of February 2021:

Polystachya aconitiflora 
Polystachya acridolens 
Polystachya acuminata 
Polystachya adansoniae 
Polystachya aethiopica 
Polystachya affinis 
Polystachya albescens 
Polystachya alicjae 
Polystachya alpina 
Polystachya anastacialynae 
Polystachya anceps 
Polystachya angularis 
Polystachya anthoceros 
Polystachya armeniaca 
Polystachya asper 
Polystachya aurantiaca 
Polystachya bamendae 
Polystachya bancoensis 
Polystachya batkoi 
Polystachya bella 
Polystachya bennettiana 
Polystachya bequaertii 
Polystachya bicalcarata 
Polystachya bicarinata 
Polystachya bifida 
Polystachya bipoda 
Polystachya biteaui 
Polystachya boliviensis 
Polystachya brassii 
Polystachya bruechertiae 
Polystachya brugeana 
Polystachya caduca 
Polystachya caespitifica 
Polystachya caespitosa 
Polystachya calluniflora 
Polystachya caloglossa 
Polystachya camaridioides 
Polystachya campyloglossa 
Polystachya canaliculata 
Polystachya candida 
Polystachya carnosa 
Polystachya caudata 
Polystachya cerea 
Polystachya cingulata 
Polystachya clareae 
Polystachya clavata 
Polystachya concreta 
Polystachya confusa 
Polystachya cooperi 
Polystachya coriscensis 
Polystachya cornigera 
Polystachya cribbiana 
Polystachya cultriformis 
Polystachya dalzielii 
Polystachya danieliana 
Polystachya dendrobiiflora 
Polystachya dewanckeliana 
Polystachya disiformis 
Polystachya disticha 
Polystachya doggettii 
Polystachya dolichophylla 
Polystachya editae 
Polystachya elastica 
Polystachya elatior 
Polystachya elegans 
Polystachya engongensis 
Polystachya epiphytica 
Polystachya erica-lanzae 
Polystachya erythrocephala 
Polystachya eurychila 
Polystachya eurygnatha 
Polystachya expansa 
Polystachya fabriana 
Polystachya fallax 
Polystachya fischeri 
Polystachya foliosa 
Polystachya fractiflexa 
Polystachya fulvilabia 
Polystachya fusiformis 
Polystachya galeata 
Polystachya geniculata 
Polystachya geraensis 
Polystachya goetzeana 
Polystachya golungensis 
Polystachya gracilenta 
Polystachya greatrexii 
Polystachya haroldiana 
Polystachya hastata 
Polystachya heckeliana 
Polystachya heckmanniana 
Polystachya henrici 
Polystachya hoehneana 
Polystachya holmesiana 
Polystachya hologlossa 
Polystachya holstii 
Polystachya humbertii 
Polystachya isabelae 
Polystachya isochiloides 
Polystachya johnstonii 
Polystachya jubaultii 
Polystachya kaluluensis 
Polystachya kermesina 
Polystachya kingii 
Polystachya kornasiana 
Polystachya kubalae 
Polystachya kupensis 
Polystachya lacroixiana 
Polystachya laurentii 
Polystachya lawalreeana 
Polystachya lawrenceana 
Polystachya laxa 
Polystachya laxiflora 
Polystachya lejolyana 
Polystachya leonardiana 
Polystachya leonensis 
Polystachya letouzeyana 
Polystachya leucosepala 
Polystachya ligulifolia 
Polystachya lindblomii 
Polystachya lineata 
Polystachya longiscapa 
Polystachya lukwangulensis 
Polystachya macropoda 
Polystachya maculata 
Polystachya mafingensis 
Polystachya magnibracteata 
Polystachya malilaensis 
Polystachya masayensis 
Polystachya mazumbaiensis 
Polystachya melanantha 
Polystachya melliodora 
Polystachya meyeri 
Polystachya microbambusa 
Polystachya mildbraedii 
Polystachya minima 
Polystachya modesta 
Polystachya moniquetiana 
Polystachya monolenis 
Polystachya monophylla 
Polystachya moreauae 
Polystachya mukandaensis 
Polystachya mystacioides 
Polystachya mzuzuensis 
Polystachya × nebulicola 
Polystachya neobenthamia 
Polystachya ngomensis 
Polystachya nyanzensis 
Polystachya obanensis 
Polystachya oblanceolata 
Polystachya odorata 
Polystachya oreocharis 
Polystachya orophila 
Polystachya ottoniana 
Polystachya pachychila 
Polystachya pamelae 
Polystachya paniculata 
Polystachya parva 
Polystachya parviflora 
Polystachya paulensis 
Polystachya pergibbosa 
Polystachya perrieri 
Polystachya piersii 
Polystachya pinicola 
Polystachya pobeguinii 
Polystachya pocsii 
Polystachya poikilantha 
Polystachya polychaete 
Polystachya porphyrochila 
Polystachya praecipitis 
Polystachya principia 
Polystachya proterantha 
Polystachya pseudodisa 
Polystachya puberula 
Polystachya pubescens 
Polystachya pudorina 
Polystachya purpureobracteata 
Polystachya pyramidalis 
Polystachya ramulosa 
Polystachya reflexa 
Polystachya reticulata 
Polystachya retusiloba 
Polystachya rhodochila 
Polystachya rhodoptera 
Polystachya riomuniensis 
Polystachya rivae 
Polystachya rolfeana 
Polystachya rosea 
Polystachya rosellata 
Polystachya rugosilabia 
Polystachya ruwenzoriensis 
Polystachya rydingii 
Polystachya saccata 
Polystachya samilae 
Polystachya sandersonii 
Polystachya seidenfadeniana 
Polystachya serpentina 
Polystachya seticaulis 
Polystachya setifera 
Polystachya shega 
Polystachya simplex 
Polystachya songaniensis 
Polystachya sosefii 
Polystachya spatella 
Polystachya stauroglossa 
Polystachya stenophylla 
Polystachya steudneri 
Polystachya stewartiana 
Polystachya stodolnyi 
Polystachya stuhlmannii 
Polystachya suaveolens 
Polystachya subdiphylla 
Polystachya subulata 
Polystachya subumbellata 
Polystachya superposita 
Polystachya supfiana 
Polystachya teitensis 
Polystachya tenella 
Polystachya tenuissima 
Polystachya testuana 
Polystachya thomensis 
Polystachya transvaalensis 
Polystachya tridentata 
Polystachya troupiniana 
Polystachya tsaratananae 
Polystachya tsinjoarivensis 
Polystachya uluguruensis 
Polystachya undulata 
Polystachya vaginata 
Polystachya valentina 
Polystachya victoriae 
Polystachya villosa 
Polystachya virescens 
Polystachya virginea 
Polystachya vulcanica 
Polystachya walravensiana 
Polystachya waterlotii 
Polystachya wightii 
Polystachya winigeri 
Polystachya woosnamii 
Polystachya xerophila 
Polystachya zambesiaca 
Polystachya zuluensis

References

External links

 
Vandeae genera
Taxonomy articles created by Polbot